Geoffrey Yates (16 May 1918 – 14 December 2007) was a British figure skater. He competed in the men's singles event at the 1936 Winter Olympics.

Yates served in the Royal Marines during the Second World War.

References

External links
 

1918 births
2007 deaths
British male single skaters
Olympic figure skaters of Great Britain
Figure skaters at the 1936 Winter Olympics
Place of birth missing
Royal Marines personnel of World War II